Hollow were a Swedish progressive power metal band from Umeå, and is now a solo project by Andreas Stoltz.

The band begun in the early 1990s when members met in the university town of Umeå. Tomas and Andreas had decided to start a band when they met during their military service, serving together in the same platoon. Originally called Valkyrian they decided to change their name to Hollow which they felt was more in tune with their musical style "The name Hollow reflects the constant void within, which we all feel from time to time".

Influenced by acts such as Queensrÿche, Crimson Glory and Elegy in 1995 they released a six track demo called "Speak To Me". In 1997 they released a self-titled EP with four tracks which caught the attention of MM Records, a small independent label. They then went on to create two albums both released through Nuclear Blast Records, Modern Cathedral (1997) and Architect Of The Mind (1999).

Hollow chose to split up not long after the release of Architect Of The Mind.

Hollow is now a solo project of Andreas Stoltz, who in 2009 released the song "Descending" which was written in memory of Midnight, Crimson Glory's vocalist, who died in 2009.

In 2010, Polish record label Metal Mind Productions, remastered and rereleased Architect Of The Mind and Modern Cathedral as a double pack.

In 2018, the album Between Eternities of Darkness, was released by Italian label Rockshot Records. This album is a dark and tragic tale about a small family and their journey into tragedy. Hollow is on this album a one man project, but there are a few collaborations with other musicians as well, most prominently with drummer Stalder Santoz, possibly an anagram for Andreas Stoltz. The album was mainly positively received by reviewers.

Three years after their previous work, Hollow announced a new album, "Tower", scheduled for late 2021.

Members

Current members
Andreas Stoltz - all instruments (2018–present), vocals, guitars (1995-1999)

Former Members
Thomas Nilsson - bass (1995-1999)
Urban Vikström - drums (1995-1999)
Marcus Bigren - guitars (1995-1999)

Discography 
Modern Cathedral (1997)
Architect of the Mind (1999)
Between Eternities of Darkness (2018)
Tower (2021)

Notes and references 
Coming Soon – Rockshots Records
Hollow - Between Eternities of Darkness Review
Hollow
Hollow biography
Hollow (SWE)
Hollow (2) - Architect Of The Mind / Modern Cathedral
Hollow | Listen and Stream Free Music, Albums, New Releases, Photos, Videos
Metalmind

Specific

Swedish progressive metal musical groups
Swedish power metal musical groups
Musical quintets
Nuclear Blast artists